Charles Albert Busiel (November 24, 1842 – August 29, 1901) was an American manufacturer, politician, and the 45th governor of New Hampshire.

Early life
Born at Meredith Village, New Hampshire, Busiel was educated at the public schools and Gilford Academy. He worked in the family hosiery mill training in all departments of the mill to learn the business.

Career
In 1863, he purchased the Pitman Manufactory, which he ran for a few years then sold. He and two brothers continued in hosiery, and he also invested in railroads, then expanded into the banking and publishing industries.

Elected as a Democrat in 1878, Busiel was a representative in the New Hampshire House of Representatives. He became a Republican over the issue of tariffs and served several years as mayor of Laconia.

In 1894, Busiel was elected Governor of New Hampshire and served from January 3, 1895 to January 7, 1897. During his tenure, financial programs were initiated to boost the state's economy, electric trolley and railroad services were promoted. He was president of the Laconia National Bank and the City Savings Bank. He was president of Lake Shore Railroad and director of the Concord & Montreal Railroad. He was a delegate to Democratic National Convention from New Hampshire, 1880, and mayor of Laconia, New Hampshire, 1893-1895.

Death
Busiel died August 29, 1901(age 58 years, 278 days), of coronary heart disease in Laconia. His death was less than two weeks after the death by drowning of his grandson and namesake, Charles Busiel Smith. He is interred in a mausoleum at the Union Cemetery in Laconia, New Hampshire.

Family life
The son of John W. and Julia (Tilton) Busiel, Busiel married, on November 21, 1864, Eunice Elizabeth Preston, daughter of Worcester and Nancy (Evans) Preston, a native of Concord, New Hampshire. They had one child, Frances Evelyn Busiel, who later married Wilson Longstreth Smith of Germantown, Pennsylvania.

References

External links
Busiel at New Hampshire's Division of Historic Resources
Digital images; Henry Harrison Metcalf, compiler, New Hampshire Woman: A Collection of Portraits and… (The New Hampshire Publishing Co., 1895), page 23 entry and image for Eunice Elizabeth Preston

1842 births
1901 deaths
People from Laconia, New Hampshire
New Hampshire Democrats
Members of the New Hampshire House of Representatives
New Hampshire Republicans
Mayors of places in New Hampshire
Republican Party governors of New Hampshire
Governors of New Hampshire
People from Meredith, New Hampshire
19th-century American politicians